Tilton Northfield is a census-designated place (CDP) representing two adjacent villages in the towns of Tilton in Belknap County and Northfield in Merrimack County in the U.S. state of New Hampshire. The CDP encompasses the town centers of both Tilton and Northfield, located on either side of the Winnipesaukee River. The population was 3,324 at the 2020 census.

Geography
The CDP is located at  (43.443236, -71.591827). In Tilton, it extends from the Franklin city line in the west to Interstate 93 in the east, and north to Clark Road, Colby Road, and just south of Aster Drive. The Northfield part of the CDP is bordered by I-93 to the east; the Winnipesaukee River, Williams Brook and Zion Hill Road to the west; and Forrest Road to the south.

The Winnipesaukee River flows through the center of the CDP, separating the villages of Northfield and Tilton, and running west to the Merrimack River in Franklin.

Demographics

As of the census of 2010, the Tilton Northfield CDP had a population of 3,075, of whom 1,619 lived in the Tilton portion and 1,456 lived in the Northfield portion. A total of 1,212 households and 721 families resided in the CDP. There were 1,335 housing units, of which 123, or 9.2%, were vacant. The racial makeup of the CDP was 96.1% white, 0.7% African American, 0.4% Native American, 1.4% Asian, 0.0% Pacific Islander, 0.2% some other race, and 1.3% from two or more races. 1.0% of the population were Hispanic or Latino of any race.

Of the 1,212 households in the CDP, 30.0% had children under the age of 18 living with them, 39.3% were headed by married couples living together, 14.9% had a female householder with no husband present, and 40.5% were non-families. 31.4% of all households were made up of individuals, and 10.6% were someone living alone who was 65 years of age or older. The average household size was 2.34, and the average family size was 2.93.

20.9% of residents in the CDP were under the age of 18, 8.7% were from age 18 to 24, 26.7% were from 25 to 44, 27.2% were from 45 to 64, and 16.5% were 65 years of age or older. The median age was 40.4 years. For every 100 females, there were 107.8 males. For every 100 females age 18 and over, there were 107.6 males.

For the period 2011–15, the estimated median annual income for a household was $52,712, and the median income for a family was $65,556. Male full-time workers had a median income of $39,978 versus $34,118 for females. The per capita income for the CDP was $23,615. 8.8% of the population and 6.0% of families were below the poverty line, along with 15.4% of people under the age of 18 and 3.3% of people 65 or older.

References

Census-designated places in Belknap County, New Hampshire
Census-designated places in Merrimack County, New Hampshire
Census-designated places in New Hampshire